The Commodore's Messenger Organization (CMO) is an elite organization within the Sea Org, an unincorporated paramilitary wing of the Church of Scientology, described by the Church as a "fraternal religious order" comprising the most dedicated Scientologists. Its members communicate and enforce policies of the Religious Technology Center.

Formation
The first Commodore's Messengers were appointed by L. Ron Hubbard in 1968 while he was living aboard the Sea Organization flagship Apollo. These messengers were his personal administrative assistants and operated solely under his direction, ensuring that Scientology management was following Hubbard's policies.

The original four messengers were Janis Gillham (aged 11), Terri Gillham (12), Annie Tidman (12) and Suzette Hubbard (13), who was later replaced by Claire Popham (13). In 1975 while sailing in the Caribbean, due to the heat and humidity, the Messengers devised their uniforms themselves: white shorts, tie tops and platform shoes with knee high socks. Messengers conveyed messages from Hubbard and they were trained to mimic Hubbard's exact tone and mannerisms. According to messenger Tonja Burden, CMO recruits were required to practice specific training routines to attain this skill: "During the Training Routines, myself and two others practiced carrying messages to LRH. We had to listen to a message, repeat it in the same tone, and practice salutes."

Sea Org member Doreen Smith recalled a conversation she had with Hubbard concerning the origins of the CMO and why he had focused on young girls to carry out his personal tasks and deliver his executive orders:
I once asked him why he chose young girls as messengers ... He said it was an idea he had picked up from Nazi Germany. He said Hitler was a madman, but nevertheless a genius in his own right and the Nazi Youth was one of the smartest ideas he ever had. With young people you had a blank slate and you could write anything you wanted on it and it would be your writing. That was his idea, to take young people and mould them into little Hubbards. He said he had girls because women were more loyal than men.

Watchdog Committee and All Clear Unit
In April 1979, Hubbard created the Watchdog Committee (WDC). In 1981, the All Clear Unit of the CMO was set up with the purpose of ensuring an "All Clear" for Hubbard to emerge from hiding. As head of the unit, David Miscavige took orders only from Pat Broeker, who was accountable only to Hubbard.

Notable members

Suzette Hubbard

Janis Gillham
Janis Gillham, age 11, joined the Sea Organization in January 1968. She regularly attended to Hubbard for the next 11 years, until he went into hiding in 1979. In 2017, she authored Commodore's Messenger: A Child Adrift in the Scientology Sea Organization.

Annie Tidman
Annie Tidman became a messenger at age 12. She married fellow messenger Pat Broeker and they were among the few people in direct contact with L. Ron Hubbard during his final years. In November 1992, Tidman made an unannounced departure from the group, but returned after Church members intercepted her at the Boston airport. She died in 2011.

Sharone Stainforth
In 1967, Sharone Stainforth, age 10, joined the Sea Org and became one of Hubbard's original messengers on the Apollo. After leaving Scientology, she became a critic of the organization.

Shelly Miscavige
Michelle "Shelly" Barnett became a messenger at age 12. She later married fellow messenger and future Scientology leader David Miscavige. She has made no public appearances since August 2007. The Church of Scientology and the Los Angeles Police Department deny that she is missing.

Mike Rinder
Mike Rinder joined the Sea Org and worked under Hubbard on his ship the Apollo in 1973. He joined the CMO in 1978, later becoming the Church's international spokesperson. Rinder left the Church in 2007 and has since spoken out against it.

Pat Broeker
Pat Broeker was aboard the Apollo and, along with his wife Anne, were taking care of Hubbard at the time of his death. An order was issued promoting Broeker and his wife to the rank of "Loyal Officer", but that order was later cancelled.

Marc Yager
Marc Yager joined the Sea Org in 1974 and sailed with Hubbard on Apollo. Yager became a messenger and assisted Hubbard in video production. Yager was appointed commanding officer of the Commodore's Messenger Organization, chairman of the Watchdog Committee, and later, inspector general for administration in the Religious Technology Center (RTC). Ex-members of the Church have alleged that Yager was sent to "The Hole", a Rehabilitation Project Force facility.

David Miscavige
In 1977, David Miscavige, then aged 16, joined the Messengers. After Hubbard's death in 1986, Miscavige assumed the position of head of the Church of Scientology as well as ecclesiastical leader of the Scientology religion. Miscavige holds the rank of captain of the Sea Organization, and is its highest-ranking member.

See also
A Piece of Blue Sky
Bare-faced Messiah

References

Bibliography
 Dawson, Lorne L. Comprehending Cults: The Sociology of New Religious Movements. Oxford University Press, 2006.
 Squires, Rosie. "The L. Ron scandal," Sunday Telegraph (Sydney, Australia), 29 November 2009.
 

Scientology organizations
Religious organizations established in 1969